Invisible Ones is the debut solo album by Orenda Fink of Azure Ray. It was released August 23, 2005, by Saddle Creek Records.

Track listing
 "Leave It All"
 "Invisible Ones Guard the Gate"
 "Bloodline"
 "Blind Asylum"
 "Les Invisibles"
 "Miracle Worker"
 "No Evolution"
 "Dirty South"
 "Easter Island"
 "Animal"
 "Invisible Ones" (short film)
 "Bloodline" (multimedia track)

References

External links
Saddle Creek Records

2005 debut albums
Saddle Creek Records albums
Orenda Fink albums